Baltijos Futbolo Akademija, BFA is a Lithuanian football club based in Vilnius, established as an extension of the youth football academy.

History 
The football academy was established in 2007. The club has been participating in the Children and Youth Football Championships organized by the Lithuanian Football Federation as well as international football tournaments. The club has been organizing football tournaments in Vilnius.

2018 
The BFA team took part in the LFF II lyga championship for the first time. The team finished in eighth position, and announced that the team will seek I Lyga license.

2019 
The BFA did not qualify for promotion to I Lyga, however the club applied for a license anyway and after an appeal was awarded with one, having met the league criteria.

The BFA entered into partnership with FK Vilnius club, who offered an addition of several senior players. The venture took on FK Vilnius name, which was approved by the Lithuanian Football Federation. The team was allowed to participate in I Lyga under the BFA license. The league newcomer was expected to fight for higher places in the league and possibly even contest promotion to the top tier A Lyga. However, the team struggled and were in the relegation zone for the first half of the season. The team improved in the second half and managed to finish 11th.

2020 
The club announced that the partnership with FK Vilnius is coming to an end. FK Vilnius announced that they are withdrawing from the I Lyga, and will seek II Lyga license, whereas BFA announced that the club wants to continue playing in I Lyga and will seek the license. In February the I Lyga license was approved.

Seasons

Colors 
 Blue and white

References

External links
 Official club website
 Official Facebook page

Football clubs in Vilnius
Football clubs in Lithuania
Sport in Vilnius